Dot N Pro (sometimes Dot & Pro), are an American record production duo from New York City, New York consisting of S. Dot and Pro, also known as APro and Pro Da Genius. They have produced for artists including Diddy, Jeremih, 2 Chainz, Tyga, Mack Maine, and DMX. They have been named the best production duo since The Neptunes.

Before they got together, they produced on different mixtapes separately, but this caused them to compete as to who had the best beats. For instance, they both produced most of the songs on Cory Gunz' mixtapes Best Kept Secret and Youngest In Charge. They tired of competing, and decided to join forces and collaborate. They then realized that their beats sounded much better together than apart.

In 2011, they appeared on Cory Gunz' MTV docu-series, Son of a Gun. They also produced the theme song for the show and musically directed the live series finale.

Production credits

Filmography

References

External links

American hip hop record producers
American musical duos
Record production teams
African-American musical groups
Production discographies
Hip hop duos
Musical groups established in 2011
2011 establishments in New York City